Tanager is a family of birds. It may also refer to:

Birds
Bay-headed tanager
Hepatic tanager
Passerini's tanager
Summer tanager
Scarlet tanager
Spotted tanager
Western tanager
etc. - about 900 articles - see :Category:Tanagers

Aircraft
Curtiss Tanager

Expeditions
Tanager Expedition (1923–1924)

Military operations
Operation Tanager – Australia's contribution to the United Nations Mission of Support to East Timor (UNMISET)

Places
Tanager (river)

Ships
USS Tanager
USS Tanager (AM-5)
USS Tanager (AM-385)